Sabzdasht Rural District is in the Central District of Bafq County, Yazd province, Iran. At the National Census of 2006, its population was 1,641 in 565 households. There were 2,617 inhabitants in 869 households at the following census of 2011. At the most recent census of 2016, the population of the rural district was 1,382 in 530 households. The largest of its 40 villages was Sheytur, with 258 people.

References 

Bafq County

Rural Districts of Yazd Province

Populated places in Yazd Province

Populated places in Bafq County